The Lego Movie is a 2014 computer-animated adventure comedy film written and directed by Phil Lord and Christopher Miller from a story by Lord, Miller, and Dan and Kevin Hageman. It stars the voices of Chris Pratt, Will Ferrell, Elizabeth Banks, Will Arnett, Nick Offerman, Alison Brie, Charlie Day, Liam Neeson, and Morgan Freeman. Based on the Lego line of construction toys, the film follows Emmet (Pratt), an ordinary construction worker Lego minifigure who helps a resistance movement stop a tyrannical businessman (Ferrell) from gluing everything in the Lego world into his vision of perfection.

A collaboration between production houses from the United States, Australia, and Denmark, The Lego Movie premiered in Los Angeles on February 1, 2014, and was released in the United States on February 7. Made on a production budget of $60–65million, it earned $468.1million worldwide. On the review aggregator website Rotten Tomatoes, the film holds an approval rating of  based on  reviews.

The film and its soundtrack have received various awards and nominations. It garnered two Critics' Choice Movie nominations at the 20th ceremony, winning for the Best Animated Feature. The National Board of Review named The Lego Movie the Best Animated Film of 2014. It won one of six nominations at the 42nd Annie Awards. At the 87th Academy Awards, the film received a Best Original Song nomination (for "Everything Is Awesome"). Various critic circles have also picked The Lego Movie as the best animated feature film of the year.

Accolades

Notes

References

External links
 

The Lego Movie (franchise)
Lists of accolades by film
Warner Bros. Discovery-related lists